npj Quantum Materials is a peer-reviewed open-access scientific journal covering the properties, fabrication techniques and applications of quantum materials. This includes superconducting and topological materials, correlation phenomena, and quantum effects in materials and systems for energy generation.

Founded in 2016, it is published by the Nature Publishing Group in cooperation with Nanjing University. Sang-Wook Cheong and Steven Kivelson act as editors in chief.

Abstracting and indexing
The journal is abstracted and indexed in major indexing services like Science Citation Index Expanded (SCI-E), Current Contents, Scopus and the Directory of Open Access Journals (DOAJ).

According to the Journal Citation Reports, the journal has a 2020 impact factor of 7.032 and a 5-year impact factor of 7.41.

References

External links

Quantum mechanics journals
Publications established in 2016
Nature Research academic journals
Creative Commons Attribution-licensed journals
English-language journals
Continuous journals